Church End was a hamlet in Bedfordshire, England, and now forms part of the town of Arlesey.

Originally, Church End was a small rural settlement, named after St Peters Church which was built in the 12th century, in the area by the monks of Waltham Abbey. However, the expansion of Arlesey northwards led to Church End being encompassed by the town. Today, Church End is in the northern part of Arlesey town, and is the location of Arlesey railway station.

Central Bedfordshire District
Former populated places in Bedfordshire